Benjamin Genocchio (born 1969) is an Australian art critic and non-fiction writer. Since October 2019 he has been director-at-large for Shoshana Wayne in Los Angeles and New York.

He worked as an art critic for The New York Times, and then as editor-in-chief of Art+Auction magazine, Modern Painters magazine and the website "artinfo.com". He was director of the Armory Show until November 2017, when he was ousted following allegations of sexual harassment, which he denied. He was previously editor-in-chief of Artnet News, where he also faced accusations of sexual harassment.

Family and education
Genocchio was born in Sydney, New South Wales, in 1969, the second of four sons of an Italian father, Giorgio, who worked on a cruise ship, and an Australian mother, Jennifer.  Genocchio grew up in Lane Cove and attended Newington College  from 1981 to 1986. As a youth he had a short attention span and a low boredom threshold, traits he says led him to become an art critic. Genocchio completed a PhD in history of art at the University of Sydney in 1996. He is a citizen of Australia and Italy.

Career

In late December 2002 Genocchio moved to New York to begin writing for The New York Times. In 2008 he published Dollar Dreaming, an exposé of corruption and double-dealing in the $500-million trade in Aboriginal art in Australia and abroad.

In early 2010 he became editorial director at Louise Blouin Media, and editor-in-chief of Art+Auction magazine, Modern Painters and artinfo.com. He left the post at Modern Painters in 2011.

Genocchio left Blouin Media in January 2014 and joined Artnet, where he was made editor-in-chief of Artnet News, a 24-hour art news website. In December 2015 he was appointed director of the Armory Show. He was ousted in November 2017 after multiple accusations of sexual harassment were made against him that extended to his time at Louise Blouin Media, Artnet and the Armory. He denied the accusation in a statement saying that while he had conflicts with employees, he never acted inappropriately, and apologized for any behavior perceived as disrespectful.

In October 2019 he was director-at-large for the Shoshana Wayne Gallery in Los Angeles and New York.

Personal life 
In 2014 Genocchio lived in New York state and was married to curator Melissa Chiu, with whom he wrote Asian Art Now.

Publications
 Dollar Dreaming: The Rise of the Aboriginal Art Market
 Fiona Foley: Solitaire
 The Art of Persuasion, Australian Art Criticism
 Simeon Nelson, Passages
 (ed.) What is Installation?
 Asian Contemporary Art
 (ed.) Contemporary Asian Art, A Critical Reader

References

External links
 Benjamin Genocchio Official Website

1969 births
Living people
Australian art critics
Australian art historians
Australian expatriates in the United States
People educated at Newington College
Australian people of Italian descent
Journalists from Sydney
The New York Times people
Australian magazine editors
Australian art curators